Karin Püschel ( Kahlow, born 8 January 1958) is a German former volleyball player who competed for East Germany in the 1980 Summer Olympics.

She was born in Merseburg.

In 1980 she was part of the East German team which won the silver medal in the Olympic tournament. She played three matches.

References 
 

1958 births
Living people
German women's volleyball players
Olympic volleyball players of East Germany
Volleyball players at the 1980 Summer Olympics
Olympic silver medalists for East Germany
Olympic medalists in volleyball
Medalists at the 1980 Summer Olympics
People from Merseburg
Sportspeople from Saxony-Anhalt